Pelochrista teleopa is a species of moth of the family Tortricidae. It is found in Jammu and Kashmir, India.

The ground colour of the forewings is pale cinnamon, densely scaled darker, more brown in the distal fourth especially towards the tornus. The hindwings are brownish tinged cream in the basal area.

Etymology
The species name refers to the distinct shapes of the valve and is derived from Greek teleopa (meaning visible from afar).

References

Moths described in 2006
Moths of Asia
Eucosmini
Taxa named by Józef Razowski